The Chief Clerk of the California Assembly is a nonpartisan elected officer of the California State Assembly.  The Chief Clerk serves as the chief parliamentarian of the 80-member house. The clerk is also charged with maintaining the records and votes of the Assembly, engrossing and enrolling bills, providing members with analyses of bills on third reading, amending legislation, and publishing the bills, journals, files, and histories of the lower house.

Historically, persons who have served as Chief Clerk have possessed an advanced degree when they were elected (e.g., M.A. or J.D.). 

In California, three officers are elected every two years when the Assembly organizes:  Chief Clerk, Chief Sergeant-at-Arms, and Chaplain. These officers are not members of the house and serve the legislature in a nonpartisan capacity.

The current Chief Clerk is Sue Parker, first woman to hold the position, who was first elected in 2020.

This is a list of Chief Clerks of the California Assembly.

To keep the numbering system correct, there are instances where a clerk has had a hiatus between terms of service (e.g. J.M. Anderson is the sixth person to serve as Chief Clerk: he served 1855–56, had a four-year hiatus, and then returned from 1860–61). Therefore, the numbering of Chief Clerks in column one fluctuates based upon the fact that some clerks served previously. Their original "clerk number" is retained on the left with an asterisk to indicate why it is out of numeric sequence.

 For information about the Assembly, see California State Assembly.
 For a list of all members of the Assembly see Members of the California State Legislature

  For example: Arthur Ohnimus (J.D., St. Ignatius), James Driscoll (M.A., Claremont College) and R. Brian Kidney (M.A., University of San Francisco). Several years after he was elected Clerk, Driscoll earned a J.D. from McGeorge School of Law.
  Resigned February 1, 1850.
  Resigned February 15, 1853.
  Retired October 4, 1963.

References
 California's Legislature, Appendix E, California State Legislature, Office of the Chief Clerk of the Assembly, published 2006.
  Rules of the Assembly (House Resolution 1, 2007-08 Regular Session)
 Chief Clerk's web site

External links
 California State Assembly web site
 National Conference of State Legislatures
 California State Capitol: Legislative History

California State Legislature